Secunda (from Latin: second, secund, secundi meaning second/following) is a town built amidst the coalfields of the Mpumalanga province of South Africa.

History

Early history
During 1974, Sasol (Transvaal) Townships Limited, a subsidiary company of Sasol Limited, was instructed to establish and develop Secunda. After the site for the Sasol complex had been identified, it had to be decided whether or not to combine the existing towns of Evander and Trichardt. The huge burden that extensions of this nature would have had on the financial and administrative resources of the established communities as well as the tempo at which such development should proceed was decisive and resulted in the decision to develop Trichardt and Secunda to be one town, named Secunda. Evander however stayed a separate town. On 28 June 1976, the first town area was proclaimed. 1976 saw the first resident of Secunda moving in. Mr Etienne Prop Smith moved into Tuyshuys, the original house of the farm Goede Hoop, on which Secunda was built.

One of the many refineries at the respective plants was the target of two attempted bombings by the African National Congress.  The first, unsuccessful bombing occurred in 1980, and the second, partly successful bombing a few years later.  Patrick Chamusso was wrongly accused of the first attempt, and as a result of his arrest and torture he became an ANC activist and was instrumental in carrying out the second as part of the ANC's campaign of attacks on South African industrial facilities. This episode is recounted in the film Catch a Fire, released in 2006.

Geography
Another important factor determining its location, was the availability of water. Water for Sasol is supplied from Grootdraai Dam near Standerton.

Streetscape
The layout of the town is unique in the sense that residential quarter cells were laid out which are bordered by main routes and green strips, with the result that only internal traffic is found within such cells. Access to schools, the Central Business District and the suburban shopping centres is made easier for pedestrians and cyclists as the green strips are free from vehicles and the distance to be travelled is shorter.

Architecture
Today distinctive features of the landscape around Secunda are the massive cooling towers, high chimneys and the steel structures unique to the South-African oil-from-coal industry. The highest structure in Secunda is the 301-metre-high chimney at the Sasol Three plant. The chimney is an Eskom type chimney comprising four  refractory brick-lined concrete fluor of 4.6-metre diameter each. The windshield is 292 metres high with an internal diameter of 26 metres. The chimney was constructed by Concor as part of a contract to construct the Sasol Three steamplant with Hochtief. The foundations of the chimney comprised vertical and raked piles. This chimney is one of the tallest free-standing structures in the Southern Hemisphere.

Topography
Secunda is situated on the latitude 26° and longitude 29° and is 1,620 meters above sea level. It is 180 kilometers from Pretoria, 135 kilometers from Johannesburg, 100 km from Brakpan, 250 km from Potchefstroom, 530km from Durban and 1530km from Cape Town.

Climate
During the summer, Secunda has a very pleasant climate with an average temperature of 26.5 °C. During the winter, the nights are cold, and frost regularly occurs, whereas temperatures can go as low as -10'C at low lying areas in extreme cases. The days are dry, sunny and warm with an average day temperature of 
16.2 °C.

Demographics
The town has approximately 40,198 inhabitants, with an estimated 118,889 people living in nearby township, named eMbalenhle - meaning "pretty flower". The town has experienced significant growth in the 1990's and early 2000's due to the expansions underway at the Sasol complexes.

Economy

Industry
Secunda has the 1973 oil crisis to thank for its existence, as it was founded to make South Africa less dependent on the importation of crude oil. It is doubtful whether an industry such as Sasol Synfuels ever formed part of the plans when Sasol One was formed in the 1950s. Sasol Two (1 March 1980) and Sasol Three (10 May 1982), known as Secunda CTL, the largest coal liquefaction plant in the world, produces synthetic fuel, diesel, and related fuels and petrochemicals from coal gasification. Secunda Synfuels Operations, a division of Sasol South Africa Limited (previously known as Sasol Two and Sasol Three) are large industrial refineries, within view, and sometimes earshot, of the town of Secunda.

Mining
As coal is the main ingredient for the industrial process, Sasol Two had to be developed around a coalfield. The four coal mines, namely Brandspruit, Middelbult, Bosjesspruit, and Twistdraai, form the largest underground coal mining complex in South Africa and annually supply approximately 37,3 million tons of coal to Sasol Synthetic Fuels. A further two mines, Impumelelo (2014) and Shondoni (2015) were opened to help supply a total of a third of the country's coal for the project.

Culture and contemporary life
In February 1977 Secunda's first library was opened, located in the kitchen, lounge and dining rooms of a house in Danie Theron Street. At this time a clinic service was also introduced, with personnel of the Transvaal Council for Non-Urban areas visiting Secunda twice a week. The clinic was located in the same house as the library. A permanent service with permanent personnel was established in 1978.

Other important occasions were the opening of the Secunda Sports Stadium on 1 February 1986, as well as the opening and handing over of the Johannes Stegmann Theatre by Sasol Limited on 6 August 1986.

On 11 November 1987 an ultra modern library was opened. This library is known as the Jan Coertzen Public Library and has a reference, an adult, children's and a music section as well as an auditorium with conference facilities. In 1994 a community center was completed in Secunda. It was named after Rev. Casper Breedt.

The Secunda Mall was opened in late 2013, hosting a Checkers Hyper, Game, a Ster-kinekor Cinema Complex, various restaurants and various other national chain stores. A fitness centre owned by Sasol operates in the centre of the business district, and is open to the public. Secunda is also the host town of a casino called "Graceland", a building based on the times of Elvis and American culture from that period. The Waterfront next to the sports stadium also has entertainment, various restaurants, and bars.

A free, weekly, 5 km parkrun takes place every Saturday morning at 8:00am. The event is hosted by local volunteers and was first held on Saturday 25 October 2014.

Around December, a local business owner sponsors a dressed up Santa and his Elves and uses his fire engine red vehicle decorated with sleigh décor and drives around Secunda to gift goody bags to local families.

Law and government

Government
On 3 November 1975, the Health Committee of Secunda was established by means of an Administrative Proclamation, to carry out the functions for local government. At this time Secunda still had no residents. The original Committee consisted of five members. At that stage, the only official was Mr. JF Coertzen, whose job designation was Secretary. He commenced his duties on 1 May 1976 with his office in Pretoria, as the then Chairman of the Committee was stationed in Pretoria and no office accommodation was available in Secunda. On 1 December 1976, the Secretary moved to Secunda and occupied offices, consisting of two rooms in a house situated at No 4 Danie Theron Street. At this time about 150 families resided in Secunda, with more moving in daily.

The Health Committee was later expanded to seven committee members, of whom six were appointed by the Administrator from a list of names submitted by Sasol, whilst the remaining member was appointed by the Administrator himself. Secunda acquired Town Council status on 5 November 1985.

Secunda is now part of the Govan Mbeki Local Municipality (formerly Highveld East Local Municipality) situated in the Gert Sibande District, of Mpumalanga. Secunda is the seat of the municipality.

Education
Secunda has three high schools. 

Hoërskool Oosterland has 900 learners, which is disaggregated between 75% Afrikaans and 25% English classes. High School Secunda has roughly 1,000 students. Highveld Park High School was founded with English as the language of education. All three of these schools comply with the requirements of the Department of Basic Education and that of the South African Schools Act (No.84 of 1996). There are a variety of subjects to choose from, including technical subjects, which are offered from Gr 10-12.

There are five Primary Schools in Secunda, four of them started out with Afrikaans as the only tuition language: Laerskool Goedehoop, Laerskool Kruinpark, and Laerskool Secunda, however Laerskool Oranjegloed Primary started to provide tuition in both English and Afrikaans and became exclusively English in 2014. Highveld Ridge Primary School was founded as an English primary school.

Another notable independent school in Secunda is Curro Secunda which provides education for Grade R/Grade 0 to Grade 12 and a nursery at Curro Castle Secunda for 3 months to 5 year olds. This school is owned by JSE listed Curro Holdings Limited and was established as at 2015.

Infrastructure

Airfields 

Secunda has an airfield, which is located on the South-West outskirts of the town.

Shopping 

Secunda has a CBD built in a mall format, and is anchored by stores such as Shoprite.

Secunda Mall is a modern mall, with a 52,000m² GLA, which opened across the CBD, on 23 October 2013, with tenants spanning from Checkers Hyper, Pick 'n Pay, Game, Woolworths, Truworths, Foschini Group and the remains of an Edgars, amongst other national chain stores and restaurants.

References

 Meintjies, Johannes; Sasol 1950-1975; Tafelberg Uitgewers; 1975

External links

 Govan Mbeki Municipality

 
Populated places in the Govan Mbeki Local Municipality
Populated places established in 1974
Cities in South Africa